This article is about the particular significance of the year 1813 to Wales and its people.

Incumbents
Lord Lieutenant of Anglesey – Henry Paget, 1st Marquess of Anglesey 
Lord Lieutenant of Brecknockshire and Monmouthshire – Henry Somerset, 6th Duke of Beaufort
Lord Lieutenant of Caernarvonshire – Thomas Bulkeley, 7th Viscount Bulkeley
Lord Lieutenant of Cardiganshire – Thomas Johnes
Lord Lieutenant of Carmarthenshire – George Rice, 3rd Baron Dynevor 
Lord Lieutenant of Denbighshire – Sir Watkin Williams-Wynn, 5th Baronet    
Lord Lieutenant of Flintshire – Robert Grosvenor, 1st Marquess of Westminster 
Lord Lieutenant of Glamorgan – John Stuart, 1st Marquess of Bute 
Lord Lieutenant of Merionethshire - Sir Watkin Williams-Wynn, 5th Baronet
Lord Lieutenant of Montgomeryshire – Edward Clive, 1st Earl of Powis
Lord Lieutenant of Pembrokeshire – Richard Philipps, 1st Baron Milford
Lord Lieutenant of Radnorshire – George Rodney, 3rd Baron Rodney

Bishop of Bangor – Henry Majendie 
Bishop of Llandaff – Richard Watson
Bishop of St Asaph – William Cleaver 
Bishop of St Davids – Thomas Burgess

Events
January - Sir Joseph Bailey sells his 25% share in Cyfarthfa ironworks for £20,000.
April - Thomas Price (Carnhuanawc) moves to Crickhowell to take over several parishes in the vicinity.
30 September - Sir Jeremiah Homfray is forced to sell his house at Cwm Rhondda to settle his debts.
2 November - Richard Parry Price, heir to the Puleston estates, is created a baronet.
date unknown
Anthony Hill and his two brothers go into partnership at the Plymouth ironworks.
The "Branwen ferch Llŷr" sepulchral urn is discovered on the banks of the river Alaw in Anglesey (later placed in the British Museum by Richard Llwyd).
The first permanent military barracks in Wales are opened at Brecon.
An Independent minister, David Davies, is forced to leave his teaching post at Carmarthen Academy after charges of "immorality" are made against him.
David Daniel Davis is appointed a physician at Queen Charlotte's Hospital in London.
Charles James Apperley becomes agent for his brother-in-law's estates in Caernarvonshire, taking up residence at Tŷ Gwyn, Llanbeblig.
Diana Noel, 2nd Baroness Barham, settles at Fairy Hill, Gower. 
Thomas Charles of Bala publishes his "rules" for the conduct of Sunday schools.
Elijah Waring founds a new periodical, The Cambrian Visitor: a Monthly Miscellany, which fails after eight months.

Arts and literature

New books

English language
Hugh Davies - Welsh Botanology … A Systematic Catalogue of the Native Plants of Anglesey, in Latin, English, and Welsh
Walter Davies (Gwallter Mechain) - General View of the Agriculture and Domestic Economy of North Wales
M. Surrey - Llewellyn, Prince of Wales, or Gellert the Faithful Dog (play)

Welsh language
William Owen - Lloffion o Faes Boaz
William Williams (Gwilym Peris) - Awengerdd Peris

Music

Births
30 January - Samuel Prideaux Tregelles, Biblical scholar (d. 1875)
2 May - Mordecai Jones, industrialist (d. 1880)
30 June - Thomas Briscoe, translator (d. 1895)
1 August - William Ambrose (Emrys), poet (d. 1873)
12 September - Daniel Jones, missionary (d. 1846)
10 October - William Adams, mining engineer (d. 1886)
date unknown - John Edwards (Meiriadog), poet (d. 1906)

Deaths
9 March - Edward Williams, minister and theologian, 62
23 March - Princess Augusta of Great Britain, daughter of Frederick, Prince of Wales, and mother of Caroline of Brunswick, later Princess of Wales, 75
17 April - Thomas Edwards (Yr Hwntw Mawr), murderer
28 July - John Randolph, former Bishop of Bangor, 64
11 August (or 12 August) - John Price, librarian, 78
date unknown - Edward Pugh, artist

References

 Wales